Notts, Lincs & Derbyshire/Leicestershire 1 West was a tier 9 English Rugby Union league with teams from Derbyshire, Nottinghamshire and the western region of Leicestershire taking part.  Promoted teams moved up to Midlands 4 East (North) and relegated teams dropped to Notts, Lincs & Derbyshire/Leicestershire 2 West.

The division was created in 2000, along with its counterpart Notts, Lincs & Derbyshire/Leicestershire 1 East, following the splitting of the East Midlands and Leicestershire leagues and the subsequent merging of the Leicestershire and Notts, Lincs & Derbyshire leagues.  After four seasons the league was discontinued following further restructuring and the majority of teams moved into the newly created Notts, Lincs, Derbyshire/North Leicestershire and Derbyshire/North Leicestershire divisions.

Original teams

When this division was introduced in 2000 it contained the following teams:

Aylestone St James – promoted from East Midlands/Leicestershire 2 (champions)
Bakewell Mannerians – transferred from Notts, Lincs & Derbyshire 1 (10th)
Castle Donington – transferred from Notts, Lincs & Derbyshire 1 (11th)
Dronfield – transferred from Notts, Lincs & Derbyshire 1 (15th)
East Leake – promoted from Notts, Lincs & Derbyshire 2 (7th)
Leesbrook – promoted from Notts, Lincs & Derbyshire 2 (10th)
Melbourne – transferred from Notts, Lincs & Derbyshire 1 (9th)
Nottingham Casuals – transferred from Notts, Lincs & Derbyshire 1 (6th)
Old Newtonians – transferred from East Midlands/Leicestershire 1 (9th)
Rolls-Royce – promoted from Notts, Lincs & Derbyshire 2 (8th)
Tupton – promoted from Notts, Lincs & Derbyshire 2 (6th)

Notts, Lincs & Derbyshire/Leicestershire 1 West honours

Promotion play-offs

During the 2003–04 season there was a promotion playoff between the runners up of Notts, Lincs & Derbyshire/Leicestershire 1 East and Notts, Lincs & Derbyshire/Leicestershire 1 West for the third place to Midlands 4 East (North).  The team with the superior league record has home advantage in the tie.

Number of league titles

Ashfield (2)
East Leake (1)
Old Newtonians (1)

Notes

See also
Notts, Lincs & Derbyshire/Leicestershire 1 East
Notts, Lincs & Derbyshire/Leicestershire 2 East
Notts, Lincs & Derbyshire/Leicestershire 2 West
Midlands RFU
Notts, Lincs & Derbyshire RFU
Leicestershire RU
English rugby union system
Rugby union in England

References

External links
 NLD RFU website
 Leicestershire Rugby Union website

9
Rugby union in Derbyshire
Rugby union in Nottinghamshire
Rugby union in Leicestershire
Sports leagues established in 2000
Sports leagues disestablished in 2004